John Price Cochran (February 7, 1809 – December 27, 1898) was an American farmer and politician from Middletown, in New Castle County, Delaware. He was a member of the Democratic Party, who served as Governor of Delaware.

Early life and family
Cochran was born in Appoquinimink Hundred, near Middletown, Delaware, son of Robert and Rebecca Ryland Cochran. He married Eliza Polk in 1833 and had seven children: William R., Clara Rebecca, Charles Polk, John Price Jr., Eliza, Julian, and Cyrus. His wife, Eliza died in childbirth in 1855 and he married secondly, Mary Tumlin. There were no known children of this marriage. They lived at "Cochran Grange," one mile west of Middletown and were members of the Presbyterian Church. He was a "leading farmer and fruit grower."

Professional and political career
Cochran was elected to the New Castle County Levy Court in 1838 and 1846. In 1874 he was elected Governor of Delaware by defeating Isaac Jump, the Republican candidate and served from January 19, 1875 until January 21, 1879. He was the first governor from New Castle County in thirty years, and was regarded as a progressive governor, advocating improvements to the school law, and reapportionment of the General Assembly, to more fairly reflect the population of New Castle County. The reapportionment proposal was not approved. The General Assembly did, however, pass legislation requiring businesses serving the public "to provide equal accommodations for those who might be deemed obnoxious by others." This effort to deny civil rights to African-Americans was to remain on the books until 1963.

Death and legacy
Cochran died at his home near Middletown and is buried in the Forest Presbyterian Cemetery at Middletown.

One of his former homes, Cochran Grange, survives today. Another, Summerton, inherited by his daughter Eliza Green, remained in the Green family until 1953, after which it had a succession of owners. In the mid-1980s and mid-2016, Summerton was considered for historic preservation, but such was opposed by its owner since 2012, Bluegrass Investments LLC, which kept the property vacant and arranged for its demolition and replacement by a Royal Farms convenience store and gas station. The involved real estate agent, Lisa Johannsen, in light of the 500 online signatures to stop the demolition, arranged for a farewell picnic.

Almanac
Elections are held on the first Tuesday after November 1. The governor takes office the third Tuesday in January, and has a four-year term.

References

Images
Hall of Governors Portrait Gallery . Portrait courtesy of Historical and Cultural Affairs, Dover

External links
Biographical Directory of the Governors of the United States

Delaware’s Governors
The Political Graveyard

Places with more information
Delaware Historical Society; website; 505 North Market Street, Wilmington, Delaware 19801; (302) 655-7161
University of Delaware; Library website; 181 South College Avenue, Newark, Delaware 19717; (302) 831-2965

1809 births
1898 deaths
American Presbyterians
People from Middletown, Delaware
Farmers from Delaware
Democratic Party governors of Delaware
Burials in New Castle County, Delaware
19th-century American politicians